The second season of Australian drama television series Prisoner (commonly known as Prisoner: Cell Block H) premiered on Network Ten on 22 January 1980. It consists of 86 episodes and concluded on 12 November 1980.

This season's storylines include the escape of Roslyn Coulson, aided by terrorist Janet Dominguez and the subsequent shooting of Erica Davidson; Lizzie's exoneration; the bomb explosion which causes the deaths of Jim Fletcher's family; Bea Smith's feud with new prisoner Kay White; Judy Bryant's planned revenge on corrupt officer Jock Stewart for the murder of her girlfriend Sharon Gilmour; the season finale tunnel escape collapse.

Cast

Main 

 Patsy King as Governor Erica Davidson
 Fiona Spence as Vera Bennett
 Peta Toppano as Karen Travers
 Val Lehman as Bea Smith
 Elspeth Ballantyne as Meg Jackson
 Colette Mann as Doreen Anderson
 Sheila Florance as Lizzy Birdsworth
 Barry Quin as Greg Miller
 Gerard Maguire as Jim Fletcher
 Monica Maughan as Pat O'Connell
 George Mallaby as Paul Reid
 Betty Bobbitt as Judy Bryant

Central supporting 

 Amanda Muggleton as Chrissie Latham
 Sigrid Thornton as Roslyn Coulson

Recurring 

 Deidre Rubenstein as Janet Dominguez
 Penelope Stewart as Kathleen Leach
 Penny Ramsay as Leila Fletcher
 Ray Meagher as Geoff Butler
 Judith McGrath as Colleen Powell
 Jeanie Drynan as Angela Jeffries
 Carmel Millhouse as Mary McCauley
 Cornelia Frances as Carmel Saunders
 Henry Cuthbertson as Dr. Herbert
 Lloyd Cunnington as Mr. Goodwin
 Graham Rouse as Mal James
 John Higginson as Tony Reid
 Rosalind Speirs as Caroline Simpson
 Bernadette Gibson as Vivienne Williams
 Terry McDermott as Brian Williams
 Ian Gilmour as Kevin Burns
 Joan Letch as Rhonda West
 Charmayne Lane as Shirley
 Margot Knight as Sharon Gilmour
 Lester Morris as Mr. Muir
 Jane Clifton as Margot Gaffney
 Kate Turner as Sally Blakely
 Rob Forza as Bill Harris
 Peter Ford as Michael Simpson
 Carl Bleazby as Hugh Gilbertson
 Babs Wheelton as Louisa Burns
 Fay Mokotow as Mrs. Seymour 
 Tom Oliver as Ken Pearce
 Nanette Wallace as Sally Nichols
 Simon Reichelt as Andrew O'Connell
 Jentah Sobott as Heather "Mouse" Trapp
 Dina Mann as Debbie Pearce
 Reylene Pearce as Phyllis Hunt
 Kevin Summers as Det. Sgt. Parsons
 Paul Young as Capt. Lloyd Barton
 Penny Downie as Kerry Vincent

 Rod Mullinor as David Austin 
 Michael Duffield as Charles Baldwin
 Kirk Alexander as Dr. East
 Tommy Dysart as Jock Stewart
 Ian Smith as Ted Douglas
 Stephen O'Rourke as Harry Bone
 Eugene Schlusser as Mr. Westmore
 Sidney Jackson as Det. Sgt. Teagan
 Caroline Gillmer as Helen Smart
 Judith Dick as Marcia/Ellen Huntley
 Michelle Argue as Josie
 Tracey-Jo Riley as Leanne Bourke
 Jude Kuring as Noeline Bourke
 Susanne Haworth as Gail Summers
 Jeremy Higgins as Tim Summers
 John Lee as Andrew Reynolds
 John Larking as Vince Talbot
 Joy Westmore as Joyce Barry
 Jack Harris as Terry Barry
 Rob Steele as Dr. Rupert
 Sandy Gore as Kay White
 Janet Lord as Mrs. Blakely
 Anne Scott-Pendlebury as Pauline Curtis
 Colin Vancao as Weasel
 Maureen Edwards as Hazel Crowe
 Lois Ramsay as Agnes Forster
 Anne-Marie Wiles as Nancy
 Bryon Williams as Dr. Weissman
 Brian Moll as Mr. Spenser
 Elaine Cusick as Linda Jones
 Sue Devine as Tracey Morris
 Darren Sole as Danny Jones
 Terry Gill as Det. Insp. Grace
 Belinda Davey as Hazel Kent
 Anthony Hawkins as Bob Morris
 Rowena Wallace as Anne Griffin
 Wynn Roberts as Stuart Gillespie

Episodes

Accolades
 Sammy Award for Best Actress in a Series – Sheila Florance (1980)
 Logie Award for Best Lead Actress in a Drama Series – Sheila Florance (1981)
 Logie Award for Best Drama Series – Prisoner (1981)
 Logie Award for Most Popular Show in Victoria – Prisoner (1981)

 Nominated: Logie Award for Best Supporting Actress in a Series – Colette Mann (1981)
 Nominated: Logie Award for Best Supporting Actor in a Series – Gerard Maguire (1981)

Home media
The following is a list of DVD sets which contain individual episodes from season two or the complete season as a whole.

Notes

References

1980 in Australian television